Allionia incarnata is a flowering plant in the four o'clock family (Nyctaginaceae) native to the Caribbean, the southern United States, and south through Central America and most of western South America. It is a perennial (sometimes annual) herbaceous plant with dark pink flowers. Allionia incarnata is known as pink three-flower, pink windmills, trailing allionia, trailing four-o'clock, and trailing windmills.

Three varieties are accepted:
Allionia incarnata var. incarnata 
Allionia incarnata var. nudata 
Allionia incarnata var. villosa

References

Nyctaginaceae
Plants described in 1759